The 2015 Texas Rangers season was the Rangers' 55th season of the franchise and the 44th since the team relocated to Arlington, Texas. After a disastrous 2014 season in which the Rangers finished last in the entire American League (AL) and 3rd worst in all of Major League Baseball (MLB), and despite starting the season with an 8–16 record and being under .500 as late as August 13, the Rangers would clinch the American League West title on the final day of the season. It was the team's 6th division title and 7th postseason appearance in franchise history. They lost to the Toronto Blue Jays in five games in the Division Series. First year manager Jeff Banister was named the AL Manager of the Year.

Offseason

October 30: Colby Lewis, Neal Cotts and Scott Baker become free agents.
 Lewis re-signed with the Rangers.
 Cotts signed with the Milwaukee Brewers.
 Baker signed with the New York Yankees.

October 31: Sent 3 players to the minors.

November 20: Promoted 4 players from the minors, released 2, signed 3 to a minor league contract (2 with an invite to spring training), and sent Daniel Robertson to the Los Angeles Angels for an unnamed player.

November 24: Released Jim Adduci and signed Ed Lucas to a minor league contract and invited him to spring training.

December 2: Adam Rosales, Michael Kirkman, and Alexi Ogando become free agents.
 Rosales and Kirkman resigned with the Rangers.
 Ogando signed with the Boston Red Sox.

December 8: Claimed Scott Barnes off waivers from the Baltimore Orioles.
 He would be sent to the minors and claimed off waivers by the Toronto Blue Jays.

December 11: Signed 3 players to a minor league contract and invited them to Spring training, while drafting Delino DeShields.

December 12: Received Ross Detwiler from the Washington Nationals for Chris Bostick and Abel De Los Santos.

December 14: Signed J. T. Wise to a minor league contract and invited him to spring training.

December 15: Signed Francisco Mendoza to a minor league contract.

December 16: Signed Kyuji Fujikawa. Also signed 3 players to a minor league contract with 2 receiving an invite to spring training.

December 18: Signed Mike McDade to a minor league contract.

Week of January 5: Signed Adam Rosales and gave 2 players a minor league contract (1 with an invite to spring training).

Week of January 12: Signed 7 players to a minor league contract and invited 1 of them to spring training.

Week of January 19: Received Yovani Gallardo and cash from the Milwaukee Brewers for Corey Knebel, Luis Sardinas, and Marcos Diplan and received Gonzalez Germen from the Yankees for cash. Signed Juan Perez and Ross Ohlendorf to a minor league contract and invited 6 others to spring training.
 Germen would be claimed by the Chicago Cubs off waivers.
 Ohlendorf received an invite to spring training.

January 27: Received Anthony Ranaudo from the Boston Red Sox for Robbie Ross, Jr.

January 28: Signed 2 players to a minor league contract.

February 3: Invited Martire Garcia to spring training.

February 4: Signed Ryan Ludwick to a minor league contract and invited him to spring training.

February 6: Signed Nate Schierholtz to a minor league contract and invited him to spring training.

Regular season

Season standings

American League West

American League Wild Card

Record against opponents

Season summary
The Rangers would start the season as poorly as their 2014 season ended, reaching a season low eight games under .500 (8-16) on May 3. The lone bright spot was the resurgence of Prince Fielder from season-ending surgery the prior year. At the All-Star break, the Rangers improved slightly, but were still under .500 (42-46).

The second half of the season would see the team begin a resurgence, led in part by the acquisition of Cole Hamels, the emergence of Shawn Tolleson as the team's closer, the returns of Martin Perez and Derek Holland from the disabled list, and improved play by Shin-Soo Choo and Adrián Beltré. However, as late as August 3, the Rangers were still below .500. The improved play continued, and on September 15 (during a four-game home series against their in-state and division rivals the Houston Astros), the Rangers would defeat the Astros 6-5, taking the division lead in the process and ultimately sweeping the series. The Rangers would not relinquish the division lead from that point forward, though they would not clinch the division until the last day of the season when they defeated the Los Angeles Angels 9-2 behind a complete game effort from Hamels.

Game log

|- style="background:#fbb;"
| 1 || April 6 || @ Athletics || L 0–8 || S. Gray (1-0) || Y. Gallardo (0-1) || — || 36,067 || 0–1
|- style="background:#cfc;"
| 2 || April 7 || @ Athletics || W 3–1 || C. Lewis (1-0) || J. Hahn (0-1) || N. Feliz (1) || 15,025 || 1–1
|- style="background:#fbb;"
| 3 || April 8 || @ Athletics || L 0–10 || S. Kazmir (1-0) || R. Detwiler (0-1) || — || 19,479 || 1–2
|- style="background:#cfc;"
| 4 || April 9 || @ Athletics || W 10-1 || N. Martinez (1-0) || K. Graveman (0-1) || — || 16,045 || 2–2
|- style="background:#fbb;"
| 5 || April 10 || Astros || L 1–5 || C. McHugh (1-0) || D. Holland (0-1) || — || 48,885 || 2–3
|- style="background:#cfc;"
| 6 || April 11 || Astros || W 6–2 || Y. Gallardo (1-1) || R. Hernandez (0-1) || — || 36,833 || 3–3
|- style="background:#fbb;"
| 7 || April 12 || Astros || L 6–4 (14) || W. Harris (1-0) || L. Verrett (0-1) || S. Deduno (1) || 35,276 || 3–4
|- style="background:#fbb;"
| 8 || April 13 || Angels || L 3–6 || M. Shoemaker (2-0) || R. Detwiler (0-2) || H. Street (3) || 18,401 || 3–5
|- style="background:#cfc;"
| 9 || April 14 || Angels || W 8–2 || N. Martinez (2-0) || D. Rucinski (0-1) || — || 21,805 || 4–5
|- style="background:#fbb;"
| 10 || April 15 || Angels || L 2–10 || H. Santiago (1-1) || A. Ranaudo (0-1) || — || 25,575 || 4–6
|- style="background:#cfc;"
| 11 || April 17 || @ Mariners || W 3–1 || Y. Gallardo (2-1) || J. Happ (0-1) || N. Feliz (2) || 36,606 || 5–6
|- style="background:#fbb;"
| 12 || April 18 || @ Mariners || L 1–3 || F. Hernandez (2-0) || C. Lewis (1-1) || F. Rodney (3) || 43,017 || 5–7
|- style="background:#fbb;"
| 13 || April 19 || @ Mariners || L 10–11 || Y. Medina (1-0) || N. Feliz (0-1) || — || 31,601 || 5–8
|- style="background:#cfc;"
| 14 || April 21 || @ D-backs || W 7–1 || S. Tolleson (1-0) || D. Hudson (0-1) || — || 18,345 || 6–8
|- style="background:#fbb;"
| 15 || April 22 || @ D-backs || L 5–8 || A. Bradley (2-0) || Y. Gallardo (2-2) || — || 17,886 || 6–9
|- style="background:#fbb;"
| 16 || April 24 || @ Angels || L 2–3 || G. Richards (1-1) || K. Kela (0-1) || H. Street (6) || 41,054 || 6–10
|- style="background:#fbb;"
| 17 || April 25 || @ Angels || L 1–4 || V. Pestano (1-0) || C. Lewis (1-2) || H. Street (7) || 38,016 || 6–11
|- style="background:#cfc;"
| 18 || April 26 || @ Angels || W 5–4 (11) || N. Feliz (1-1) || J. Alvarez (0-1) || — || 35,053 || 7–11
|- style="background:#fbb;"
| 19 || April 27 || Mariners || L 1–3 || T. Walker (1-2) || Y. Gallardo (2-3) || F. Rodney (5) || 19,748 || 7–12
|- style="background:#fbb;"
| 20 || April 28 || Mariners || L 1–2 || J. Happ (2-1) || R. Detwiler (0-3) || F. Rodney (6) || 23,714 || 7–13
|- style="background:#fbb;"
| 21 || April 29 || Mariners || L 5–2 || F. Hernandez (4-0) || W. Rodriguez (0-1) || F. Rodney (7) || 26,037 || 7–14
|-

|- style="background:#fbb;"
| 22 || May 1 || Athletics || L 5–7 || D. Otero (2-1) || R. Mendez (0-1) || T. Clippard (2) || 29,700 || 7–15
|- style="background:#cfc;"
| 23 || May 2 || Athletics || W 8–7 (10) || K. Kela (1-1) || R. Cook (0-2) || — || 32,207 || 8–15
|- style="background:#fbb;"
| 24 || May 3 || Athletics || L 1–7 || S. Gray (4-0) || Y. Gallardo (2-4) || — || 36,006 || 8–16
|- style="background:#cfc;"
| 25 || May 4 || @ Astros || W 2–1 || K. Kela (2-1) || C. Qualls (0-2) || N. Feliz (3) || 17,597 || 9–16
|- style="background:#cfc;"
| 26 || May 5 || @ Astros || W 7–1 || W. Rodriguez (1-1) || S. Feldman (2-3) || — || 20,951 || 10–16
|- style="background:#cfc;"
| 27 || May 6 || @ Astros || W 11–3 || C. Lewis (2-2) || S. Deduno (0-1) || — || 22,230 || 11–16
|- style="background:#cfc;"
| 28 || May 7 || @ Rays || W 5–4 || A. Claudio (1-0) || C. Archer (3-4) || N. Feliz (4) || 8,701 || 12–16
|- style="background:#fbb;"
| 29 || May 8 || @ Rays || L 2–8 || N. Karns (2-1) || Y. Gallardo (2-5) || — || 11,704 || 12–17
|- style="background:#fbb;"
| 30 || May 9 || @ Rays || L 2–7 || A. Bellatti (1-0) || R. Detwiler (0-4) || B. Boxberger (8) || 20,943 || 12–18
|- style="background:#cfc;"
| 31 || May 10 || @ Rays || W 2–1 || K. Kela (3-1) || K. Jepsen (0-2) || N. Feliz (5) || 14,521 || 13–18
|- style="background:#cfc;"
| 32 || May 11 || Royals || W 8–2 || C. Lewis (3-2) || D. Duffy (2-2) || — || 36,006 || 14–18
|- style="background:#fbb;"
| 33 || May 12 || Royals || L 6–7 (10) || G. Holland (1-0) || S. Pimentel (0-1) || — || 23,659 || 14–19
|- style="background:#cfc;"
| 34 || May 13 || Royals || W 5–2 || Y. Gallardo (3-5) || Y. Ventura (2-3) || N. Feliz (6) || 26,258 || 15–19
|- style="background:#fbb;"
| 35 || May 14 || Royals || L 3–6 || J. Guthrie (3-2) || R. Detwiler (0-5) || G. Holland (5) || 33,818 || 15–20
|- style="background:#fbb;"
| 36 || May 15 || Indians || L 3–8 || R. Webb (1-0) || W. Rodriguez (1-2) || — || 29,524 || 15–21
|- style="background:#fbb;"
| 37 || May 16 || Indians || L 8–10 || S. Atchison (1-1) || N. Feliz (1-2) || C. Allen (6) || 31,045 || 15–22
|- style="background:#cfc;"
| 38 || May 17 || Indians || W 5–1 || N. Martinez (3-0) || C. Carrasco (4-4) || — || 32,189 || 16–22
|- style="background:#fbb;"
| 39 || May 19 || @ Red Sox || L 3–4 || W. Miley (3-4) || Y. Gallardo (3-6) || K. Uehara (10) || 36,580 || 16–23
|- style="background:#cfc;"
| 40 || May 20 || @ Red Sox || W 2–1 || P. Klein (1-0) || J. Kelly (1-3) || S. Tolleson (1) || 35,726 || 17–23
|- style="background:#cfc;"
| 41 || May 21 || @ Red Sox || W 3–1 || W. Rodriguez (2-2) || C. Buchholz (2-5) || S. Tolleson (2) || 34,945 || 18–23
|- style="background:#cfc;"
| 42 || May 22 || @ Yankees || W 10–9 || C. Lewis (4-2) || M. Pineda (5-2) || R. Ohlendorf (1) || 40,008 || 19–23
|- style="background:#cfc;"
| 43 || May 23 || @ Yankees || W 15–4 || N. Martinez (4-0) || C. Sabathia (2-6) || — || 42,067 || 20–23
|- style="background:#cfc;"
| 44 || May 24 || @ Yankees || W 5–2 || Y. Gallardo (4-6) || C. Capuano (0-2) || S. Tolleson (3) || 45,681 || 21–23
|- style="background:#cfc;"
| 45 || May 25 || @ Indians || W 10–8 || T. Scheppers (1-0) || M. Rzepczynski (1-2) || S. Tolleson (4) || 13,614 || 22–23
|- style="background:#cfc;"
| 46 || May 26 || @ Indians || W 4–3 || K. Kela (4-1) || N. Hagadone (0-1) || S. Tolleson (5) || 11,352 || 23–23
|- style="background:#fbb;"
| 47 || May 27 || @ Indians || L 3–12 || C. Carrasco (6-4) || C. Lewis (4-3) || — || 15,936 || 23-24
|- style="background:#fbb;"
| 48 || May 28 || Red Sox || L 5–1 || E. Rodriguez (1-0) || N. Martinez (4-1) || — || 34,085 || 23–25
|- style="background:#cfc;"
| 49 || May 29 || Red Sox || W 7–4 || Y. Gallardo (5-6) || S. Wright (2-2) || S. Tolleson (6) || 38,176 || 24–25
|- style="background:#cfc;"
| 50 || May 30 || Red Sox || W 8–0 || C. Gonzalez (1-0) || W. Miley (4-5) || — || 42,831 || 25–25
|- style="background:#cfc;"
| 51 || May 31 || Red Sox || W 4–3 || R. Ohlendorf (1-0) || K. Uehara (2-2) || — || 32,848 || 26–25
|-

|- style="background:#cfc;"
| 52 || June 2 || White Sox || W 15–2 || C. Lewis (5-3) || J. Samardzija (4-3) || — || 27,558 || 27–25
|- style="background:#fbb;"
| 53 || June 3 || White Sox || L 2–9 || C. Sale (5-2) || N. Martinez (4-2) || — || 32,598 || 27–26
|- style="background:#cfc;"
| 54 || June 4 || White Sox || W 2–1 (11) || T. Scheppers (2-0) || D. Jennings (1-2) || — || 27,616 || 28–26
|- style="background:#cfc;"
| 55 || June 5 || @ Royals || W 4–0 || C. Gonzalez (2-0) || E. Volquez (4-4) || — || 38,159 || 29–26
|- style="background:#cfc;"
| 56 || June 6 || @ Royals || W 4–2 || W. Rodriguez (3-2) || Y. Ventura (3-5) || S. Tolleson (7) || 37,924 || 30–26
|- style="background:#fbb;"
| 57 || June 7 || @ Royals || L 3–4 || W. Davis (3-1) || K. Kela (4-2) || G. Holland (9) || 38,202 || 30–27
|- style="background:#cfc;"
| 58 || June 9 || @ Athletics || W 2–1 || N. Martinez (5-2) || S. Gray (7-3) || S. Tolleson (8) || 14,617 || 31–27
|- style="background:#fbb;"
| 59 || June 10 || @ Athletics || L 4–5 || T. Clippard (1-3) || K. Kela (4-3) || — || 14,290 || 31–28
|- style="background:#fbb;"
| 60 || June 11 || @ Athletics || L 0–7 || S. Kazmir (3–4) || C. Gonzalez (2-1) || — || 14,489 || 31–29
|- style="background:#cfc;"
| 61 || June 12 || Twins || W 6–2 || T. Scheppers (3-0) || A. Thompson (1-2) || — || 41,765 || 32–29
|- style="background:#cfc;"
| 62 || June 13 || Twins || W 11–7 || C. Lewis (6-3) || M. Pelfrey (5-3) || — || 28,661 || 33–29
|- style="background:#fbb;"
| 63 || June 14 || Twins || L 4–3 || C. Fien (2-2) || S. Tolleson (1-1) || G. Perkins (22) || 33,970 || 33–30
|- style="background:#cfc;"
| 64 || June 15 || Dodgers || W 4–1 || Y. Gallardo (6-6) || C. Frias (4-4) || S. Tolleson (9) || 32,248 || 34–30
|- style="background:#cfc;"
| 65 || June 16 || Dodgers || W 3–2 || S. Tolleson (2-1) || J. Ravin (2-1) || — || 31,897 || 35–30
|- style="background:#cfc;"
| 66 || June 17 || @ Dodgers || W 5–3 || W. Rodriguez (4-2) || C. Kershaw (5-4) || K. Kela (1) || 42,906 || 36–30
|- style="background:#fbb;"
| 67 || June 18 || @ Dodgers || L 0–1 || K. Jansen (2-0) || K. Kela (4-4) || — || 46,977 || 36–31
|- style="background:#cfc;"
| 68 || June 19 || @ White Sox || W 2-1 || C. Lewis (7-3) || D. Robertson (4-2) || S. Tolleson (10) || 22,864 || 37–31
|- style="background:#fbb;"
| 69 || June 20 || @ White Sox || L 2-3 || C. Rodon (3-1) || N. Martinez (5-3) || D. Robertson (14) || 25,738 || 37–32
|- style="background:#fbb;"
| 70 || June 21 || @ White Sox || L 2-3 || J. Petricka (2-2) || A. Claudio (1-1) || – || 33,668 || 37-33
|- style="background:#fbb;"
| 71 || June 23 || Athletics || L 6-8 || J. Chavez (4-6) || C. Gonzalez (2-2) || D. Pomeranz (1) || 35,889 || 37-34
|- style="background:#fbb;"
| 72 || June 24 || Athletics || L 2-8 || K. Graveman (4-4) || W. Rodriguez (4-3) || — || 34,216 || 37-35
|- style="background:#fbb;"
| 73 || June 25 || Athletics || L 3-6 || S. Gray (9-3) || K. Kela (4-5) || — || 29,251 || 37-36
|- style="background:#fbb;"
| 74 || June 26 || @ Blue Jays || L 2-12 || M. Buehrle (8-4) || N. Martinez (5-4) || — || 25,821 || 37-37
|- style="background:#cfc;"
| 75 || June 27 || @ Blue Jays || W 4-0 || Y. Gallardo (7-6) || M. Boyd (0-1) || — || 37,167 || 38-37
|- style="background:#fbb;"
| 76 || June 28 || @ Blue Jays || L 2-3 || D. Hutchison (8-1) || C. Gonzalez (2-3) || — || 42,376 || 38-38
|- style="background:#cfc;"
| 77 || June 29 || @ Orioles || W 8-1 || W. Rodriguez (5-3) || B. Norris (2-7) || — || 21,565 || 39-38
|- style="background:#cfc;"
| 78 || June 30 || @ Orioles || W 8-6 || C. Lewis (8-3) || M. Gonzalez (6-5) || S. Tolleson (11) || 27,370 || 40-38
|-

|- style="background:#fbb;"
| 79 || July 1 || @ Orioles || L 2-4 || W. Chen (4-4) || N. Martinez (5-5) || Z. Britton (23) || 23,019 || 40-39
|- style="background:#cfc;"
| 80 || July 2 || @ Orioles || W 2-0 || K. Kela (5-5) || C. Roe (2-1) || S. Tolleson (12) || 31,915 || 41-39
|- style="background:#fbb;"
| 81 || July 3 || Angels || L 2-8 || G. Richards (9-5) || C. Gonzalez (2-4) || — || 39,320 || 41-40
|- style="background:#fbb;"
| 82 || July 4 || Angels || L 0-13 || H. Santiago (5-4) || W. Rodriguez (5-4) || — || 47,877 || 41-41
|- style="background:#fbb;"
| 83 || July 5 || Angels || L 6-12 || C. Wilson (7-6) || C. Lewis (8-4) || — || 28,638 || 41-42
|- style="background:#fbb;"
| 84 || July 7 || D-backs || L 2-4 || R. Ray (3-4) || Y. Gallardo (7-7) || B. Ziegler (13) || 30,955 || 41-43
|- style="background:#fbb;"
| 85 || July 8 || D-backs || L 4-7 || R. Delgado (4-2) || M. Harrison (0-1) || B. Ziegler (14) || 27,390 || 41-44
|- style="background:#cfc;"
| 86 || July 10 || Padres || W 4-3 || W. Rodriguez (6-4) || I. Kennedy (4-9) || S. Tolleson (13) || 33,033 || 42-44
|- style="background:#fbb;"
| 87 || July 11 || Padres || L 5-6 || J. Benoit (6-4) || S. Tolleson (2-2) || C. Kimbrel (22) || 36,248 || 42-45
|- style="background:#fbb;"
| 88 || July 12 || Padres || L 1-2 || T. Ross (6-7) || Y. Gallardo (7-8) || C. Kimbrel (23) || 32,428 || 42-46
|- bgcolor=#bbb
| – || July 14 || 86th All-Star Game || colspan=6 | National League vs. American League (Great American Ball Park, Cincinnati)
|- style="background:#fbb;"
| 89 || July 17 || @ Astros || L 2–3 || C. McHugh (10-5) || M. Perez (0-1) || L. Gregerson (19) || 36,904 || 42–47
|- style="background:#cfc;"
| 90 || July 18 || @ Astros || W 7–6 || C. Lewis (9-4) || S. Feldman (4-5) || S. Tolleson (14) || 41,941 || 43–47
|- style="background:#fbb;"
| 91 || July 19 || @ Astros ||L 0–10 || D. Keuchel (12-4) || Y. Gallardo (7-9) || — || 36,532 || 43–48
|- style="background:#fbb;"
| 92 || July 20 || @ Rockies || L 7–8 || J. Axford (2-2) || T. Scheppers (3-1) || — || 35,027 || 43–49
|- style="background:#cfc;"
| 93 || July 21 || @ Rockies || W 9–0 || M. Harrison (1-1) || K. Kendrick (3-11) || — || 43,012 || 44–49
|- style="background:#cfc;"
| 94 || July 22 || @ Rockies || W 10–8 || T. Scheppers (4-1) || J. Axford (2-3) || S. Tolleson (15) || 33,348 || 45–49
|- style="background:#cfc;"
| 95 || July 24 || @ Angels ||  W 4–2 || C. Lewis (10-4) || N. Tropeano (1-1) || S. Tolleson (16) || 42,046 || 46–49
|- style="background:#cfc;"
| 96 || July 25 || @ Angels || W 7–6 || S. Patton (1-0) || J. Smith (4-3) || S. Tolleson (17) || 43,052 || 47–49
|- style="background:#fbb;"
| 97 || July 26 || @ Angels || L 7–13 || A. Heaney (5-0) || N. Martinez (5-6) || — || 38,539 || 47–50
|- style="background:#fbb;"
| 98 || July 27 || Yankees || L 2–6 || I. Nova (3-3) || M. Harrison (1-2) || — || 33,691 || 47–51
|- style="background:#fbb;"
| 99 || July 28 || Yankees || L 5–21 || D. Moreno (1-0) || M. Perez (0-2) || A. Warren (1) || 28,403 || 47–52
|- style="background:#cfc;"
| 100 || July 29 || Yankees || W 5–2 || C. Lewis (11-4) || M. Tanaka (7-4) || S. Tolleson (18) || 31,658 || 48–52
|- style="background:#cfc;"
| 101 || July 30 || Yankees || W 7–6 || S. Tolleson (3-2) || A. Miller (0-2) || — || 34,407 || 49–52
|- style="background:#cfc;"
| 102 || July 31 || Giants || W 6–3 || N. Martinez (6-6) || M. Bumgarner (11-6) || — || 30,674 || 50–52
|-

|- style="background:#fbb;"
| 103 || August 1 || Giants || L 7-9 || H. Strickland (2-1) || S. Dyson (3-4) || S. Casilla (27) || 41,114 || 50–53
|- style="background:#cfc;"
| 104 || August 2 || Giants || W 2-1 || M. Perez (1-2) || M. Leake (9-6) || S. Dyson (1) || 22,234 || 51–53
|- style="background:#cfc;"
| 105 || August 3 || Astros || W 12-9 || C. Lewis (12-4) || L. McCullers (5-4) || S. Tolleson (19) || 21,671 || 52–53
|- style="background:#cfc;"
| 106 || August 4 || Astros || W 4-3 || Y. Gallardo (8-9) || D. Straily (0-1) || S. Tolleson (20) || 29,953 || 53–53
|- style="background:#cfc;"
| 107 || August 5 || Astros || W 4-3 || N. Martinez (7-6) || S. Kazmir (6-6) || S. Dyson (2) || 31,782 || 54–53
|- style="background:#fbb;"
| 108 || August 7 || @ Mariners || L 3-4 || H. Iwakuma (3-2) || C. Hamels (6-8) || C. Smith (11) || 29,320 || 54–54
|- style="background:#cfc;"
| 109 || August 8 || @ Mariners || W 11-3 (11) || S. Tolleson (4-2) || R. Rasmussen (1-1) || — || 39,132 || 55–54
|- style="background:#fbb;"
| 110 || August 9 || @ Mariners || L 2-4 || F. Hernandez (14-6) || C. Lewis (12-5) || C. Smith (12) || 29,939 || 55–55
|- style="background:#fbb;"
| 111 || August 11 || @ Twins || L 2-3 || G. Perkins (1-3) || S. Patton (1-1) || — || 26,663 || 55–56
|- style="background:#fbb;"
| 112 || August 12 || @ Twins || L 1–11 || M. Pelfrey (6–7) || N. Martinez (7–7) || — || 30,683 || 55–57
|- style="background:#cfc;"
| 113 || August 13 || @ Twins || W 6-5 || K. Kela (6-5) || C. Fien (2-5) || S. Tolleson (21) || 30,357 || 56–57
|- style="background:#cfc;"
| 114 || August 14 || Rays || W 5-3 || S. Dyson (4-4) || J. McGee (1-2) || S. Tolleson (22) || 32,512 || 57–57
|- style="background:#cfc;"
| 115 || August 15 || Rays || W 12-4 || C. Lewis (13-5) || C. Archer (10-9) || — || 32,351 || 58–57
|- style="background:#cfc;"
| 116 || August 16 || Rays || W 5-3 || Y. Gallardo (9-9) || D. Smyly (0-2) || S. Tolleson (23) || 29,167 || 59–57
|- style="background:#cfc;"
| 117 || August 17 || Mariners || W 4-3 || S. Tolleson (5-2) || F. Rodney (5-5) || — || 19,880 || 60–57
|- style="background:#fbb;"
| 118 || August 18 || Mariners || L 2-3 || H. Iwakuma (5-2) || C. Gonzalez (2-5) || C. Smith (13) || 26,870 || 60–58
|- style="background:#cfc;"
| 119 || August 19 || Mariners || W 7-2 || D. Holland (1-1) || M. Montgomery (4-6) || — || 20,142 || 61–58
|- style="background:#fbb;"
| 120 || August 20 || @ Tigers || L 0-4 || A. Simon (11-7) || M. Perez (1-3) || — || 33,727 || 61–59
|- style="background:#cfc;"
| 121 || August 21 || @ Tigers || W 2-0 || C. Lewis (14-5) || J. Verlander (1-6) || S. Tolleson (24) || 34,718 || 62–59
|- style="background:#cfc;"
| 122 || August 22 || @ Tigers || W 5-3 || Y. Gallardo (10-9) || R. Wolf (0-1) || — || 39,082 || 63–59
|- style="background:#cfc;"
| 123 || August 23 || @ Tigers || W 4-2 || C. Hamels (7-8) || M. Boyd (1-4) || S. Tolleson (25) || 39,317 || 64–59
|- style="background:#fbb;"
| 124 || August 25 || Blue Jays || L 5-6 || L. Hawkins (3-1) || S. Tolleson (5-3) || R. Osuna (15) || 22,227 || 64–60
|- style="background:#fbb;"
| 125 || August 26 || Blue Jays || L 4-12 || D. Price (13-4) || C. Lewis (14-6) || — || 20,572 || 64–61
|- style="background:#cfc;"
| 126 || August 27 || Blue Jays || W 4-1 || Y. Gallardo (11-9) || M. Estrada (11-8) || S. Tolleson (26) || 17,884 || 65–61
|- style="background:#cfc;"
| 127 || August 28 || Orioles || W 4-1 || C. Hamels (8-8) || K. Gausman (2-6) || S. Tolleson (27) || 28,337 || 66–61
|- style="background:#cfc;"
| 128 || August 29 || Orioles || W 4-3 || M. Perez (2-3) || U. Jimenez (9-9) || S. Tolleson (28) || 29,768 || 67–61
|- style="background:#cfc;"
| 129 || August 30 || Orioles || W 6-0 || D. Holland (2-1) || M. Gonzalez (9-11) || — || 22,256 || 68–61
|- style="background:#fbb;"
| 130 || August 31 || @ Padres || L 0-7 || T. Ross (10-9) || C. Lewis (14-7) || — || 19,013 || 68–62
|-

|- style="background:#cfc;"
| 131 || September 1 || @ Padres || W 8-6 || R. Ohlendorf (2-0) || M. Rzepczynski (2-4) || — || 21,215 || 69–62
|- style="background:#cfc;"
| 132 || September 2 || @ Padres || W 4-3 (10) || S. Dyson (5-4) || B. Norris (3-10) || — || 18,730 || 70–62
|- style="background:#fbb;"
| 133 || September 4 || @ Angels || L 2-5 || G. Richards (13-10) || M. Perez (2-4) || H. Street (32) || 37,073 || 70–63
|- style="background:#cfc;"
| 134 || September 5 || @ Angels || W 2-1 || D. Holland (3-1) || J. Smith (4-5) || S. Tolleson (29) || 39,889 || 71–63
|- style="background:#fbb;"
| 135 || September 6 || @ Angels || L 0-7 || H. Santiago (8-9) || C. Lewis (14-8) || — || 38,367 || 71–64
|- style="background:#cfc;"
| 136 || September 7 || @ Mariners || W 3-0 || Y. Gallardo (12-9) || R. Elias (4-8) || S. Tolleson (30) || 18,469 || 72–64
|- style="background:#cfc;"
| 137 || September 8 || @ Mariners || W 9-6 || C. Hamels (9-8) || T. Walker (10-8) || S. Tolleson (31) || 13,389 || 73–64
|- style="background:#fbb;"
| 138 || September 9 || @ Mariners || L 0-6 || V. Nuno (1-2) || M. Perez (2-5) || — || 14,330 || 73–65
|- style="background:#fbb;"
| 139 || September 10 || @ Mariners || L 0-5 || F. Hernandez (17-8) || D. Holland (3-2) || — || 16,842 || 73–66
|- style="background:#cfc;"
| 140 || September 11 || Athletics || W 4-0 || C. Lewis (15-8) || J. Chavez (7-15) || — || 28,133 || 74–66
|- style="background:#fbb;"
| 141 || September 12 || Athletics || L 3-5 || S. Nolin (1-1) || Y. Gallardo (12-10) || — || 30,487 || 74–67
|- style="background:#cfc;"
| 142 || September 13 || Athletics || W 12-4 || C. Gonzalez (3-5) || F. Doubront (3-2) || — || 26,131 || 75–67
|- style="background:#cfc;"
| 143 || September 14 || Astros || W 5-3 || K. Kela (7-5) || W. Harris (5-4) || S. Tolleson (32) || 27,772 || 76–67
|- style="background:#cfc;"
| 144 || September 15 || Astros || W 6-5 || S. Tolleson (6-3) || O. Perez (0-2) || — || 26,942 || 77–67
|- style="background:#cfc;"
| 145 || September 16 || Astros || W 14-3 || M. Perez (3-5) || D. Keuchel (17-8) || — || 34,483 || 78–67
|- style="background:#cfc;"
| 146 || September 17 || Astros || W 8-2 || C. Lewis (16-8) || L. McCullers (5-6) || — || 31,122 || 79–67
|- style="background:#fbb;"
| 147 || September 18 || Mariners || L 1-3 || D. Farquhar (1-4) || Y. Gallardo (12-11) || T. Wilhelmsen (12) || 26,727 || 79–68
|- style="background:#cfc;"
| 148 || September 19 || Mariners || W 10-1 || C. Hamels (10-8) || V. Nuno (1-3) || — || 39,843 || 80–68
|- style="background:#fbb;"
| 149 || September 20 || Mariners || L 2-9 || F. Hernandez (18-9) || D. Holland (3-3) || — || 33,307 || 80–69
|- style="background:#cfc;"
| 150 || September 22 || @ Athletics || W 8-6 || C. Gonzalez (4-5) || D. Pomeranz (5-6) || S. Tolleson (33) || 16,524 || 81–69
|- style="background:#cfc;"
| 151 || September 23 || @ Athletics || W 10-3 || C. Lewis (17-8) || F. Doubront (3-3) || — || 16,445 || 82–69
|- style="background:#cfc;"
| 152 || September 24 || @ Athletics || W 8-1 || C. Hamels (11-8) || C. Bassitt (1-7) || — || 14,452 || 83–69
|- style="background:#cfc;"
| 153 || September 25 || @ Astros || W 6-2 || R. Ohlendorf (3-0) || S. Kazmir (7-11) || — || 35,180 || 84–69
|- style="background:#fbb;"
| 154 || September 26 || @ Astros || L 7-9 || C. McHugh (18-7) || C. Gonzalez (4-6) || W. Harris (2) || 35,736 || 84–70
|- style="background:#fbb;"
| 155 || September 27 || @ Astros || L 2-4 || D. Keuchel (19-8) || M. Perez (3-6) || L. Gregerson (29) || 36,084 || 84–71
|- style="background:#fbb;"
| 156 || September 28 || Tigers || L 4-7 || J. Verlander (5-8) || C. Lewis (17-9) || N. Feliz (10) || 27,847 || 84–72
|- style="background:#cfc;"
| 157 || September 29 || Tigers || W 7-6 || C. Hamels (12-8) || B. Farmer (0-4) || S. Tolleson (34) || 28,729 || 85–72
|- style="background:#cfc;"
| 158 || September 30 || Tigers || W 6-2 || Y. Gallardo (13-11) || M. Boyd (1-6) || — || 28,633 || 86–72
|-

|- style="background:#cfc;"
| 159 || October 1 || Angels || W 5-3 || D. Holland (4-3) || A. Heaney (6-4) || S. Tolleson (35) || 32,338 || 87–72
|- style="background:#fbb;"
| 160 || October 2 || Angels || L 1–2 || M. Morin (4-2) || S. Tolleson (6-4) || J. Smith (4) || 47,219 || 87–73
|- style="background:#fbb;"
| 161 || October 3 || Angels || L 10-11 || J. Reyes (1-0) || R. Ohlendorf (3-1) || J. Smith (5) || 37,271 || 87–74
|- style="background:#cfc;"
| 162 || October 4 || Angels || W 9-2 || C. Hamels (13-8) || G. Richards (15-12) || — || 45,772 || 88–74
|-

|-
| Legend:       = Win       = Loss       = PostponementBold = Rangers team member

Postseason

Game log

|-align="center" bgcolor= "bbffbb"
| 1 || October 8 || @ Blue Jays || W 5–3 || Y. Gallardo (1–0) || D. Price (0–1) || S. Dyson (1) || 49,834 || 1–0
|-align="center" bgcolor= "bbffbb"
| 2 || October 9 || @ Blue Jays || W 6–4 (14) || K. Kela (1–0) || L. Hawkins (0–1) || R. Ohlendorf (1) || 49,716 || 2–0
|-align="center" bgcolor= "ffbbbb"
| 3 || October 11 || Blue Jays || L 1–5 || M. Estrada (1–0) || M. Perez (0–1) || || 50,941 || 2–1
|-align="center" bgcolor= "ffbbbb"
| 4 || October 12 || Blue Jays || L 4–8 || D. Price (1–1) || D. Holland (0–1) || || 47,679 || 2–2
|-align="center" bgcolor= "ffbbbb"
| 5 || October 14 || @ Blue Jays || L 3–6 || A. Sanchez (1–0) || C. Hamels (0–1) || R. Osuna (1) || 49,742  || 2–3
|-

|-
| Legend:       = Win       = Loss       = PostponementBold = Rangers team member

Postseason rosters

| style="text-align:left" |
Pitchers: 21 Chi Chi González 33 Martín Pérez 35 Cole Hamels 37 Shawn Tolleson 41 Jake Diekman 45 Derek Holland 47 Sam Dyson 48 Colby Lewis 49 Yovani Gallardo 50 Keone Kela 51 Ross Ohlendorf 
Catchers: 38 Chris Gimenez 61 Robinson Chirinos 
Infielders: 1 Elvis Andrus 12 Rougned Odor 18 Mitch Moreland 25 Mike Napoli 29 Adrián Beltré 68 Hanser Alberto
Outfielders: 7 Delino DeShields Jr. 15 Drew Stubbs 17 Shin-Soo Choo 30 Will Venable 32 Josh Hamilton 
Designated hitters: 84 Prince Fielder
|- valign="top"

Roster

Statistics
Through 2015 season

Batting
Note: G = Games played; AB = At bats; R = Runs scored; H = Hits; 2B = Doubles; 3B = Triples; HR = Home runs; RBI = Runs batted in; BB = Base on balls; SO = Strikeouts; AVG = Batting average; SB = Stolen bases

Pitching
Note: W = Wins; L = Losses; ERA = Earned run average; G = Games pitched; GS = Games started; SV = Saves; IP = Innings pitched; H = Hits allowed; R = Runs allowed; ER = Earned runs allowed; HR = Home runs allowed; BB = Walks allowed; K = Strikeouts

Farm system

LEAGUE CHAMPIONS: Hickory

References

External links

2015 Texas Rangers Official Site 
2015 Texas Rangers at ESPN
2015 Texas Rangers season at Baseball Reference

Texas Rangers seasons
Texas Rangers
Rangers
American League West champion seasons